Hadassah Academic College Jerusalem (HAC, formerly Hadassah College of Technology) is a publicly funded college in Jerusalem.

History 
The Hadassah College of Technology was established in 1970 to meet the changing needs in Israel for trained professionals. It officially  opened in 1972. HAC became a degree-granting institution in 1996 and was accredited by the Israel Council for Higher Education in 1998.

The historic main building, dating to 1888,  was donated by the Rothschild family and became the site of Hadassah Hospital, which first opened in the Old City in 1854 as the Rothschild Hospital. An inscription above the door reads “Hôpital Israélite Meyer Rothschild,” and the name of the institution appears in Hebrew, English and Arabic on the gatepost. The building later housed the Seligsberg Vocational School for Girls.

According to Israel's Council of Higher Education, in the 2020-2021 academic year the College had a student population of over 4,000.

Mission 
The College's mission statement reads:Hadassah Academic College aspires to excellence in higher education and to provide students with the knowledge and skills needed to prepare for successful careers. HAC strives to promote meaningful academic achievement, along with the relevant hands-on training, to enhance employment opportunities for a diverse and inclusive body of students from all sectors of Israeli society.

Structure 
Studies take place in one of HAC's two schools, the Interdisciplinary School for Science, Health, and Society which prepares students for Israel's healthcare and science-based sectors; and the Interdisciplinary School for Society and Community which trains students for positions in the business and public sectors. The Azrieli Center for Diversity and Inclusion in Higher Education and Employment, established with support from the Azrieli Foundation and the Russell Berrie Foundation, supports underserved populations to ensure their integration into the world of higher education, and prepare them for successful entry into the workforce. The Blender, an innovation and entrepreneurship center, was launched in 2021 in collaboration with the Jerusalem Development Authority.

The current president of the College is Prof. Bertold (Tolo) Fridlender.

Degrees 
HAC awards the following degrees:

Bachelor's Degrees

BA in Behavior Sciences
BSc in Biotechnology
BA in Communication Disorders
BSc in Computer Science
BA in Economics and Accounting
BSc in Environmental Quality Sciences
BA in Health Systems Management
B.Des in Inclusive Industrial Design
BA in Management
B.Med.Lab.Sc in Medical Laboratory Sciences
B.Optom in Optometry
BA in Photographic Communication
BA in Politics and Communication
BSW in Social Work

Master's Degrees
 MA in Communication Disorders
MSc in Computer Science
 M.Optom in Optometry and Vision Sciences
 MA in Service Organization Management

See also
 List of Israeli universities and colleges
Education in Israel

References

External links

 Hadassah Academic College website 
 HAC website 

1970 establishments in Israel
Educational institutions established in 1970
Colleges in Israel
Hadassah Academic College
Street of the Prophets, Jerusalem